This is a list of districts in the London Borough of Camden. It includes electoral wards, which have separate articles from the neighbourhoods of the same or similar name.

Current neighbourhoods

Note: All post towns are LONDON

Past neighbourhoods
Agar Town

Electoral wards
Belsize
Bloomsbury
Camden Town with Primrose Hill
Cantelowes
Fortune Green
Frognal and Fitzjohns
Gospel Oak
Hampstead Town
Haverstock
Highgate
Holborn and Covent Garden
Kentish Town
Kilburn
King's Cross
Regent's Park
St Pancras and Somers Town
Swiss Cottage
West Hampstead

Housing estates
Bourne Estate, Holborn
Chalcots Estate, Swiss Cottage
Peckwater Estate, Kentish Town
Regent's Park Estate

 
Lists of places in London